Killarney Springs was a leisure park situated near Bude in Cornwall.

The park was established in 1990, and opened for the 1991 summer season. The park had an indoor adventure play centre, a boating lake, a tobogganing slope, go karts, bumper boats and an assault course. In 2005, a new range of attractions were brought to the park with the 'Family Fun Fair', which featured a log flume, a rollercoaster and bumper cars.

The park closed after its 2006 season because of breaches of its planning permission. The recent additions of a roller coaster and log flume were not approved by North Cornwall District Council. Since the parks closure it has been derelict with some parts of the site being demolished. The land has since been granted planning permission for a large Huf Haus development.

References 

1990 establishments in England
2006 disestablishments in England
Defunct amusement parks in England
Amusement parks in England
Defunct amusement parks in the United Kingdom
Amusement parks opened in 1990
Amusement parks closed in 2006
Tourist attractions in Cornwall
Morwenstow